The 2005 FIBA Asia Championship for Women is the qualifying tournament for 2006 FIBA World Championship for Women. The tournament was held on Qinhuangdao, China from June 19 to June 26. The championship is divided into two levels: Level I and Level II. The winner of the second division progresses to the first division at the next edition.

Preliminary round

Level I

Level II – Group A

Level II – Group B

Classification 10th–13th

Semifinals

12th place

10th place

Classification 6th–9th

Semifinals

8th place

6th place

Final round

Semifinals

3rd place

Final

Final standing

Awards

References
 Results
 archive.fiba.com
 fibaasia.net

2004
2005 in women's basketball
women
International women's basketball competitions hosted by China
B
2005 in Chinese women's sport